Rastogi is a surname of kshatriya Varg. Notable people with this surname include:

 Anil Rastogi, Indian theatre, television and film actor
Ajay Rastogi (born 1958), Indian Supreme Court judge
Anuj Rastogi, Canadian film composer, producer, musician, artist, writer and live event producer
 K. C. Rastogi, former Secretary-General of Lok Sabha, Parliament of India
 Karan Rastogi, Indian tennis player
 Manit Rastogi, Indian urban planner
 Natasha Rastogi, Indian actress and director
 Rajeev Rastogi, Indian computer scientist
 Roshni Rastogi, Indian television actress
 Sanjay Rastogi, British polymer physicist and professor
 Sonali Rastogi, Indian architect
Sunil Rastogi, Indian tailor accused of kidnapping and rape
Veer Bala Rastogi, Indian zoologist
 Vineeta Rastogi, American AIDS activist, public health worker and Peace Corps Volunteer
 Yogendra Rastogi, Indian calendar art painter
 Smriti Rastogi, pretty girl

Indian surnames